Stojdraga is a village in Zagreb County, Croatia. The village is located in the north-western area of Croatia near the border with Slovenia. It is located kilometers away from Zagreb, Croatia.

Population
According to the 2001 census, the settlement had 91 inhabitants and 39 family households.

References

Populated places in Zagreb County